Ann Ogbomo is an English actress. She is known for her multiple roles in DC Comics live-action adaptations, such as Philippus in the DC Extended Universe films Wonder Woman (2017), Justice League (2017), and Zack Snyder's Justice League (2021), Jayna-Zod in the Syfy series Krypton (2018–2019), and Gault in the Netflix series The Sandman (2022).

Education 
Ogbomo obtained her BA in theatre Arts from Middlesex University, her MA in community Arts from Goldsmiths University, her PGA in teaching Shakespeare from University of Warwick and trained as an actor at the London Academy of Music and Dramatic Art.

Career
From 2006 to 2008, Ogbomo was part of the Olivier Histories Ensemble at the Royal Shakespeare Company (RSC). She also performed in fifteen productions of Shakespeare for various theatre companies including the Royal National Theatre, Shakespeare's Globe and RSC, and she is an educational practitioner at these theatres.

Ogbomo appeared in World War Z (2013) as a Camp Humphreys soldier, Honeytrap (2014) as Lorna, Julius Caesar, Wild Target, Bouquet of Barbed Wire (2010) as Monique, The No. 1 Ladies Detective Agency (2009) as Clara, Casualty, Holby City, The Bill, Murder in Mind, and Hardware.

Ogbomo played the Amazon warrior Philippus in the 2017 films Wonder Woman and Justice League. In 2018, she starred as Jayna-Zod in the SyFy series Krypton.

Filmography

Television

Film

References

External links 
 
 Waring & McKenna: Ann Ogbomo

21st-century English actresses
Black British actresses
English television actresses
Alumni of the University of Warwick
English people of Ghanaian descent
Living people
Year of birth missing (living people)